Davies' tree frog (Ranoidea daviesae) is a species of frog in the subfamily Pelodryadinae. It is endemic to Australia. Its natural habitats are subtropical or tropical dry forests, subtropical or tropical moist lowland forests, subtropical or tropical dry shrubland, and rivers. It is currently threatened by habitat loss.

Description
The colour of the upper surface is somewhat variable, being mainly golden brown with darker brown patches but sometimes additionally having green patches. There is a narrow brown stripe running from the nostrils through the eye and back towards the groin, broadening towards the posterior and then becoming intermittent. Below the eye is a green band running as far as the shoulder and there is a thin white line along the edge of the upper lip. The skin on the underside has fine granulations. Davies' tree frog is very similar in appearance to the closely related New England tree frog but is larger, is less green and has a slightly bumpy rather than a smooth skin.

Distribution and habitat
Davies' tree frog is endemic to the eastern side of the Great Dividing Range in New South Wales, Australia. In deep gullies the surrounding area is wet sclerophyll forest and rainforest while in the tableland the streamside vegetation is mostly tea tree (Leptospermum sp.), ferns, and grass tussocks in areas of dry, open woodland or heathland.

Conservation status
It is an uncommon frog and its habitat is threatened by forest clearance for agricultural purposes, and some of the streams in which the frog breeds have been stocked with exotic fish such as trout, carp and mosquitofish which may feed on the tadpoles. For these reasons, the IUCN has assessed this frog as being a "vulnerable species".

References

Ranoidea (genus)
Amphibians of New South Wales
Amphibians described in 2001
Taxonomy articles created by Polbot
Frogs of Australia
Taxobox binomials not recognized by IUCN